Seela Maini Marjatta Sella (née Virtanen, b. 30 December 1936) is a Finnish film actress.  She was born in Tampere, Finland.

During her career, which has spanned more than 60 years to date, Seela Sella has had roles in productions at the Finnish National Theatre, the TTT-Theatre, the Tampere Comedy Theatre, etc. and has made almost 35 appearances in film and television. She has also organized monologue, song and recital nights.

Sella has worked with Finnish director Timo Koivusalo on a number of films such as Sibelius (2003) and Kalteva torni (2006). Sella has also done voice-overs for the Finnish versions of such animated movies as A Bug's Life and The Emperor's New Groove.

Sella received an award for her work from the Alfred Kordelin Foundation in 2000.

Personal life
Seela has two children, Ariel and Ilana. She converted to Judaism when she married the Finnish Jew Elis Sella.

References

External links
 

1936 births
Living people
actresses from Tampere
Finnish Jews
Finnish film actresses
Converts to Judaism
Finnish stage actresses
Finnish voice actresses
Finnish television actresses
20th-century Finnish actresses
21st-century Finnish actresses